Uswetakeiyawa is a small fishing village in Wattala Pradeshiya Sabha, Gampaha District, Western Province, Sri Lanka. 

Populated places in Gampaha District